Simon Robert Key (22 April 1945 – 3 February 2023) was a British Conservative politician who served as Member of Parliament (MP) for Salisbury from 1983 to 2010. He was also Chair of Governors at Salisbury Cathedral School.

Early life
Key was born in Plymouth, the son of Maurice Key, afterwards Bishop of Truro. At the age of 10, he was part of a school walk on Swanage Beach in Dorset where he and six friends discovered an old wartime mine which detonated; only Key and one other boy survived. He went to Salisbury Cathedral School, then independent Sherborne School. He studied economics at Clare College, Cambridge, receiving an MA and CertEd. He taught at the Loretto School in Edinburgh from 1967 to 1969, then taught economics at Harrow School from 1969 to 1983.

Political career
Key contested the Holborn and St Pancras South seat in 1979. He was the Member of Parliament for Salisbury between 1983 and 2010 and was Minister for Local Government and Inner Cities in the Department of the Environment (now DEFRA) from 1990 to 1992, setting up the Inner Cities Religious Council in 1991, and was Minister for Sport at the Department of National Heritage (now Culture, Media and Sport) from 1992 to 1993. He was Minister for Roads and Traffic from 1993 to 1994.

In opposition, Key served as a front-bench spokesman during the leaderships of William Hague and Iain Duncan Smith. In 2001, he was the shadow minister for Science and Energy, and in July 2002, he was the shadow minister for International Development. He stood down from this position in June 2003, returning to the backbenches but retaining his membership of the Defence Select Committee.

In 2005, he won re-election with an increased majority. From 1994 until 2001, he was a Director of Hortichem (now Certis UK since 2001) in Amesbury.

On 2 December 2009, Key announced his decision to stand down at the next general election.

Personal life
Robert Key was the son of Maurice Key, who was the 10th Bishop of Truro from 1960 to 1973, as well as the Bishop of Sherborne from 1947 until 1960.

Key married Susan Irvine in 1968 in Perth. They had two sons (one of whom died in infancy) and two daughters and lived in Harnham. He was a committed choral singer and member of the General Synod of the Church of England.

Key died on 3 February 2023, at the age of 77.

References

External links
 Robert Key  official site
 Guardian Unlimited Politics – Ask Aristotle: Robert Key MP
 TheyWorkForYou.com – Robert Key MP
 The Public Whip – Robert Key MP voting record
 
 Salisbury Conservatives
 BBC News – Robert Key profile 30 March 2006

News items
 Rebelling on gay adoption in 2003
 His lack of fondness for Muzak
 Comments during the early stages of the Embryo Bill in The Daily Telegraph in March 2008
 Salisbury MP will not stand again – BBC News article from 2 December 2009

1945 births
2023 deaths
Conservative Party (UK) MPs for English constituencies
UK MPs 1983–1987
UK MPs 1987–1992
UK MPs 1992–1997
UK MPs 1997–2001
UK MPs 2001–2005
UK MPs 2005–2010
English Anglicans
Alumni of Clare College, Cambridge
People educated at Sherborne School
People educated at Salisbury Cathedral School
Members of the General Synod of the Church of England
Teachers at Harrow School
Politicians from Plymouth, Devon
Place of death missing